Tammy Cochran (born January 30, 1972) is an American country music artist. Signed to Epic Records Nashville in 2000, she released her self titled debut album that year, followed a year later by Life Happened. These two albums produced a total of six chart singles for her on the Billboard country charts between 2000 and 2003, of which the highest-charting was "Angels in Waiting" at No. 9. A third album, Where I Am, followed in 2007.

Biography
Tammy was born and raised in a small rural town called Austinburg, Ohio

She was born in 1972 to Mabel and Delmar Cochran and was the third of three children. Growing up, she listened to recordings from Loretta Lynn and Barbara Mandrell. Tammy sang at her family's local church, and then she entered a talent show contest and won. She joined a couple of bands before making her own band called "TC Country" that played at fairs and weddings.

Cochran finished high school and took vocational training to become a secretary. She then moved to Nashville, Tennessee, in 1991. She married in 1996 but divorced soon afterward.

Musical career
In 1998, Cochran met Shane Decker, a songwriter for Warner Bros. Records. He offered his help on making demos to send to record companies after seeing Cochran. He also helped her get a job as a songwriter for Warner Chappell. Her demo tapes were sent to Epic Records. She released her first single that same year called "If You Can", followed by "So What". Although neither single made Top 40 on the country charts, the third single ("Angels in Waiting", written about her brothers) peaked at No. 9, and its success led to the release of her self-titled debut album. The video for "Angels in Waiting" won a Christian Country Music Award for 'Video of the Year'. This album's fourth single, "I Cry", reached Top 20 as well.

Cochran's second album for Epic, Life Happened, was released a year later. The lead-off single reached Top 20, while "Love Won't Let Me", the follow-up, peaked at No. 31 and Cochran was dropped from Epic in 2003. Her third album, Where I Am, was issued on the independent Shanachie Records in 2007.

In 2014 she starred in a musical show titled "One" at the Alabama Theatre in Myrtle Beach, South Carolina.

Discography

Studio albums

Singles

Notes

Music videos

References

External links
 [ Tammy Cochran Discography at Allmusic]
 CMT.com: Tammy Cochran

1972 births
Living people
American women country singers
American country singer-songwriters
People from Austinburg, Ohio
Singer-songwriters from Ohio
Epic Records artists
21st-century American singers
21st-century American women singers
Country musicians from Ohio